Parktown Boys' High School is a public English medium high school for boys situated in Parktown, a suburb of Johannesburg in the Gauteng province of South Africa. It is one of the oldest schools in Johannesburg. Parktown Boys' sister school is Parktown High School for Girls.

History 

The school was founded in 1920, and was originally known as North Western High School. The original school was based in disused wood and iron buildings which had previously been Police Barracks at the top of Canary Street in Auckland Park. There were eighty-seven pupils in five Form II classes, four for boys and one for girls, with acting Headmaster, C. Hare. The site is now occupied by the South African Broadcasting Corporation.

The Acting Director of Education, W.E.C. Clarke, the Inspector of High Schools, officially opened the new school with an address to the scholars and staff. He apologised for the lack of decent furniture and playing fields and promised that a new modern high school for boys would be built on the Parktown Ridge overlooking Milner Park and a new high school for girls near Zoo Lake.

The first Headmaster, P.M. Druce, arrived at the beginning of 1921 and, in February, the name of the school was changed to North Western High School. In April the first hatbands and ties arrived. The colours were purple and white.

On 1 September 1921 the school was divided into five houses: Romans, Spartans, Thebans, Trojans and Tuscans. On 19 September the name was changed again, this time to Parktown Boys' High School with the motto Arise, and the school badge a rampant lion. When the Rand Revolt took place in 1922 the school, which was in no-man's-land, had to be evacuated for a short while.

At the beginning of 1923 the school boys moved to new buildings on Parktown Ridge. They took little with them except the school name, motto and badge, the names of the five houses and the traditions they had built up. When the school reopened in the new premises, there were 435 boys on the roll and the school colours were changed to red and black. The girls remained at Auckland Park.

The Old Parktonian Association, which was formed in 1925, bought the grounds in Bedfordview but later moved to Craighall Park. Strong links with the school are maintained. 	

When Mr Druce retired in 1938 he was succeeded in turn by B.A. Logie, C.A. Yates, F.J. Marais, J.A. Cameron, N.A.M. Scheepers and T.P. Clarke, Parktown's previous Headmaster for a record 23 years, as well as Mr C. Niemand, and Mr D. Bradley.

In 1985 Druce Hall was opened to accommodate boarders and following the school's tradition in the classics, in 1987, the name Vulcan was given to the sixth school house to which all boarders belong.

Parktown Boys' High School was the first government school to allow boys who were discriminated against because of their colour into a mainstream 'white' school in 1991.

Parktown Boys' High School was the first school in South Africa to install an international standard water-based Astroturf playing surface. This surface has hosted many national and international games. More recently, Parktown has built Surgite House overlooking the McCorkell Oval (named after Neil McCorkell the school's former cricket coach and former Hampshire county cricketer who became a centurion in March 2012) to incorporate the administration and entertainment needs of Old Parktonians, as well as the Sydney Klevansky Sports and Cultural Centre.

Parktown Boys' is consistently rated as among the best performing schools in South Africa, as well as in Africa.

Parktown Boys' has a history which includes the use of boaters (called 'bashers'), a distinctive red and black uniform, school songs, and particularly 'Parktonian' language which has evolved over the years. The school motto is 'Arise' ('Surgite' in Latin). The original school buildings have provincial heritage sites status.

Mr Kevin Stippel is the current acting headmaster at Parktown. Previous headmasters were (from 1920): Mr C. Hare (Acting), Mr P.M.Druce, Mr B.A. Logie, Mr C.A. Yates, Mr F.J. Marais, Mr J.A. Cameron, Mr N.A.M. Scheeper, Mr T.P. Clarke, Mr C. Niemand, Mr R. Pillay (Acting), Mr D. Bradley and Mr Malcolm Williams.

The school is divided from Grades 8 to 12 (Matric), and grades are referred to as 'Forms' at the school. Cultural activities refer to all extramural activities excluding sporting activities. Cultural life also extends to visits to musical performances.  Numerous summer sports are offered by the school.

Druce Hall 

The school has a weekly boarding establishment (i.e. from Sunday evening to Friday afternoon), which is known as the Druce Hall. It was officially opened on 9 June 1985 and is named after P. M. Druce, the first headmaster.

The boarding is supervised with a ratio of one master to every 15 boys.

Traditions

Orientation and initiation

As part of their orientation and initiation into the school, all 'formies' (Grade 8/Form I) receive a coloured button to wear on their blazer which indicates their 'formie' status as well as what house they belong to for the duration of their Form I year. At the end of their second week of school, all formies are assigned a Matric 'Old Pot' who will help and guide that formie through their first few months at the school. The Old Pot/New Pot braai is held in the first term.

Harmful 'initiation' is banned throughout the school. However, there have been numerous incidents at the school which have been widely publicized.

Cadets

Parktown Boys' High School is one of the few schools in South Africa that still continues with the tradition of Cadets and Cadet practice every week that involves many push ups and exercise for younger grades.

Memorial parade

Parktown conducts a Memorial Parade and Service on the Sunday nearest 11 November (Remembrance Day) every year for Old Parktonians and South Africans in general who have died in various conflicts around the world. It is compulsory for all Form Is and IVs to attend.

Third Cricket/Hockey v Teachers Matches

Every year a hockey and cricket matches are held between the staff and Third teams.

Old Parktonians

The Parktonian Foundation, Surgite House, the Parktown Waterpolo Club, a Facebook page, the annual Surgite publications and the Old Parktonian Sports Club, all aim to foster the Old Parktonian Community.

Old Boys' Day

Every year in the first term Old Boys are invited to play against current school First Teams in a variety of sports. The day culminates in rugby and hockey games between the Old Boys and the recently announced First teams.

Notable alumni

Past Matriculants of the school have gone on to be leaders in all fields of South African life, from leaders in commerce, Members of Parliament, renowned academics, Springboks rugby players, other internationally renowned sportsmen, musicians and artists.

Some of these include:

Sir Henry Benson, President of the ICAEW, Member of the House of Lords
 Ian Davidson, Member of Parliament and Chief Whip of the Democratic Alliance,
 John Varty wildlife conservationist and filmmaker
 Wayne Ferreira, international tennis player and Olympic silver medalist,
 Eric Sturgess, international tennis player who reached the finals of three Grand Slam singles tournaments and won six Grand Slam doubles tournaments,
 Joseph Wolpe, psychologist and psychology theorist,
 Byron Bertram, South African professional tennis player,
 David Ipp, South African and Australian jurist
 John Burland, C.B.E., engineer and researcher,
 Christo Coetzee, distinguished South African artist,
 Manfred Gorvy, businessman and founder of the Hanover Acceptances Group,
 William Cobbett, South African political author,
 George Getzel Cohen, radiologist and anti-apartheid campaigner, Member of the Royal College of Physicians and Surgeons,
 Adam Kuper, anthropologist,
 Brigadier General Dick Lord, pilot, winner of the Distinguished Service Cross,
 Jack Penn, M.B.E., Fellow of the Royal College of Surgeons, author, and sculptor,
 Bradley Carnell, South African football player,
 Jon Jon Park, Olympic swimmer, Canada.
 Jackie Mekler, South African athlete and five-time winner of the Comrades Marathon,
 Raymond Louw, journalist, editor and media commentator,
 Martin Israel, pathologist and priest.

Academics

Notable academics include:

 Charles Feinstein, South African and British economic historian, Cambridge and Harvard Professor,

Rugby

The following Old Parktonians have represented the South African National Rugby Team (the Springboks):

 Alan Menter: Came on as a reserve for the Springboks on the tour matches to France in 1968,
 Peter Arnold Cronjé: Outside centre playing 7 tests and scoring 3 tries between 1971 and 1974 and
 Paul Campbell Robertson Bayvel: Scrumhalf playing 10 tests between 1974 and 1976.
James Dalton

Cricket

The following Old Parktonians have represented the South African national cricket team (The Proteas):

 David Ironside 
 Ronnie Grieveson 
 E.S. (Bob) Newson, 
 Tabraiz Shamsi

Hockey

Old Parktonians who have played for the national hockey side are:
Lance Louw, Neville Berman, Justin Rosenburg, Noel Day, Andre du Preez, Keith Jones, Dylan Coombes, Ricky West, Miguel Da Graca, Brian Morton

Music and Art

Some notable musicians and artists who attended Parktown Boys' High School are:

 Watkin Tudor Jones[References do not mention his education] (Aka Ninja, Die Antwoord)
 Trevor Rabin, guitarist, composer, vocalist and, more recently, noted film score composer.
 Roland Brener, artist and sculptor.
 Pallance Dladla, Actor

Parktown Boys' High School has also had some notable associations including:

Jake White coached the 2007 IRB World Cup winning Springboks and started his rugby coaching career at Parktown Boys' High School in 1982.

Controversies

In September 2018, the former water polo coach at Parktown, Collan Rex, pleaded guilty to 144 charges of sexual assault against multiple Parktown pupils and was subsequently sentenced to 23 years in prison.

On 15 January 2020, a 13-year-old pupil drowned while attending orientation camp at the Nyati Bush and River Break lodge, near Pretoria. The principal was dismissed in October 2020 following an investigation. The principal was subsequently reinstated after being cleared of any wrongdoing with the latest investigations being focused on Nyathi Bush and River Break lodge.

References

External links 
 Parktown Boys' High School official website
 Surgite The Parktonian Foundation
 The Parktown Old Boys Facebook Page
 Parktown High School for Girls official website

Boarding schools in South Africa
Schools in Johannesburg
1923 establishments in South Africa
Educational institutions established in 1923